The Californian is the second and final studio album by Californian indie rock band Sunday's Best.

Track listing
 "The Try" – 4:45
 "The Californian" – 4:17
 "Don't Let It Fade" – 4:12
 "The Salt Mines Of Santa Monica" – 3:41
 "If We Had It Made" – 5:42
 "Our Left Coast Ambitions" – 4:03
 "Without Meaning" – 5:16
 "Beethoven St." – 4:39
 "Brave, But Brittle..." – 4:03
 "Los Feliz Arms" – 5:59

References

2002 albums
Sunday's Best albums
Polyvinyl Record Co. albums